Haras du Petit Tellier is one of the oldest thoroughbred horse breeding farms in France.  Located on 1.45 km² at Sévigny, Orne in the Lower Normandy region, the business was founded in 1850 and is today run by the founder's descendant, Patrick Chedeville.

References
 Haras du Petit Tellier official website (English - French - German languages)

French racehorse owners and breeders
Horse farms in France
Buildings and structures in Orne